Saint Leo the Great School is a private Catholic school (pre-k to 8th) located in the St. Leo's neighborhood of central San Jose, California. Founded in 1915, the school is associated with the Saint Leo the Great Church, located on its campus.

History

St. Leo the Great School was originally begun by the Sisters of Notre Dame de Namur of Amiens, France and opened in 1915 with 90 students. Tuition was $2 per year. The original school building is still used today as the preschool, gym, parish hall and kitchen. In 1919 the Sisters of Notre Dame were supervising six schools, the others being Notre Dame College, Notre Dame high School, St. Joseph, St. Francis Xavier, and St. Mary.

In 1925 the Sisters of Notre Dame closed the school; there were then eight grades and 200 students.

In 1927 the Reverend Henry J. Lyne reopened the school with the support of the Sisters of Charity of the Blessed Virgin Mary.

St. Leo students won the Bellarmine College Preparatory four-year scholarship in 1937 (Franklin Lawrence) 1938 (Dick Wehner), 1939 (Robert Wehner), 1940 (Louis Mattiesen), and 1940 (Walter E. Rankin, Jr; the third consecutive year a St. Leo student scored top marks on the exam).

A new school building was built in 1950 to accommodate the school's 445 students, and the original building was converted into a gym.

In 1984 Principal Sister Dorita Clifford, BVM, was mentioned in the New York Times for her early adoption of computers at the school.

In 1985 the Sisters of Charity of the Blessed Virgin Mary turned over school administration to the lay staff of the Diocese of San Jose's department of education. In 1994 their convent home was turned over to the school for use as extended care and office space.

The gym was remodeled in 2006 with $280,000 in donations. In 2007 a "Little Lions" preschool was added for three and four-year-olds, with a purpose-built addition to the front of the original school building with its own classroom, bathrooms and play yard.  It was the first school in the diocese to have a preschool. This is now the pre-kindergarten program.

The school celebrated its centennial in 2015.

Academics
The school is part of Diocese of San Jose and accredited through WASC and WCEA.

The school puts a heavy emphasis on using technology throughout the curriculum.  iPads tablets are used for small motor skills and story reading in Kindergarten-2nd grade.  Students in 3rd-4th grade are assigned Google Chromebooks and/or iPads to access their school email and Google docs throughout the school day. At home, students use a web browser computer to access their homework. The school's 1:1 computer initiative was started in 2009 for 5th-8th grade. It was one of the first schools to adopt Google Docs.

The school runs on a trimester system, with letter grades starting in 6th grade.  All online homework and group projects are completed using Google Apps for Education (GAFE). All grades are posted weekly on Powerschool. First and second honors are given to top achieving middle school students.  The school recognizes students of the month at its prayer service.  The school has monthly goals for each grade, and students who have achieved the goal are recognized.

The summer school program was reinstated in 2017 and runs for five weeks in the summer.

Library
The school has over 6,000 printed books available for checkout in the library.

Admissions
The school hosts an open house after mass in late January during Catholic Schools Week.

Preschool is for three and four-year-olds and is capped at 24 students.  Preschool through 8th grade require a student screening test.  Transfer students are allowed to shadow classes before they join in the fall.

After-school enrichment
The school offers several after-school programs:  choir, drama, soccer, tennis, theater, Robotics, cheerleading and student council.

Athletic programs
The school participates in five competitive sports. 5th-8th grade students with good grades are allowed to join flag-football (boys'), basketball, volleyball, softball (girls') and track. The teams are no-cuts; everyone plays. The school has an active booster club.

School traditions
Turkey Drive - Each November the school initiates a one-hour frozen turkey drive drop-off.  The graduating 8th grade class routinely collect more than 130 Thanksgiving Day birds that are donated to Sacred Heart Community Service.

Visual and Performing Arts Celebration - A music and art show focusing on a different theme each year.

Prayer Pals - Each grade is matched with another grade to provide mentorship to fellow students.

Feast of St. Leo - A community-wide dinner celebration of the school and parish's patron saint, Pope Leo I, that takes place on November 10 each year.

Sock Hop - At the beginning of the school, the entire community gather for food, dancing, entertainment and games.

Graduates
St. Leo students graduating 8th grade usually go on to the following high schools:
 Archbishop Mitty High School - a coed Diocesan Catholic High School
 Bellarmine College Preparatory - an all-boys Jesuit Catholic High School
 Lincoln High School - a San Jose unified public coed High School
 Notre Dame High School - an all-girls Notre Dame de Namur Catholic High School
 Presentation High School - an all-girls Presentation Sister Catholic High School
 Valley Christian High School - a coed interdenominational Christian High School
 Willow Glen High School - a San Jose unified public coed High School
Cristo Rey San Jose Jesuit - a coed work-study High School

References

External links 
 St. Leo the Great School website
 St. Leo the Great Parish website

Private schools in San Jose, California
Roman Catholic Diocese of San Jose in California
Catholic elementary schools in California